Perks may refer to:

People

 Perks (surname)

Other uses 
 Perks baronets, an extinct title in the Baronetage of the United Kingdom
 Perks, Illinois, United States, an unincorporated community
 Perks Matriculation Higher Secondary School, India
 Polly Perks, a character in the Discworld fantasy universe

See also
 Perk (disambiguation)